The Château de la Verrerie is a château in Le Creusot, Saône-et-Loire, France.

History
It was built in 1787.

It was acquired by Adolphe Schneider and his brother, Eugène Schneider, co-founders of Schneider-Creusot, in 1837.

Architectural significance
It has been listed as an official historical monument by the French Ministry of Culture since 1984.

References

Châteaux in Saône-et-Loire
Monuments historiques of Bourgogne-Franche-Comté
Houses completed in 1787
1787 establishments in France